"You Don't Know My Name" is a song recorded by American singer-songwriter Alicia Keys for her second studio album The Diary of Alicia Keys (2003). It was written by Keys, Kanye West and Harold Lilly, and produced by Keys and West. The song contains a sample from the 1975 song "Let Me Prove My Love to You", written by J. R. Bailey, Mel Kent and Ken Williams and performed by The Main Ingredient. It was released as the lead single from The Diary of Alicia Keys on November 10, 2003, by J Records.

"You Don't Know My Name" became Keys' third top-ten hit in the United States, peaking at number three on the Billboard Hot 100, as well as topping the Hot R&B/Hip-Hop Songs for eight consecutive weeks. Critically acclaimed, the song won a Grammy Award for Best R&B Song and a Soul Train Music Award for Best R&B/Soul Single, Female. It was sampled on rapper Lil Wayne's 2008 song "Comfortable", featuring Babyface and produced by West. Blender placed the song at number 37 on its list of "The 100 Best Songs of 2004".

Music video
Directed by Chris Robinson and Andrew Young, rapper Mos Def plays Michael Harris, Alicia's love interest, and Keys plays a waitress at a restaurant. The music video follows Keys working as a waitress at a café. One day, Keys meets a man (played by Mos Def) in the café, and she falls in love with him. Later on, Keys is at a house party where she runs into that same man when a fight is about to break out, and the scene resembles the house party scene in the movie Cooley High. Later in the video, Keys imagines getting the courage to call him and to tell him about her feelings. However, at the end of the movie, she remembers his order but there is no other recognition and the scene ends with his card still being in the bowl and Keys staring out the window since she will never be able to reveal her true feelings for the man.

Track listings and formats

 US 7-inch single
A. "You Don't Know My Name" (radio version) — 4:26
B. "You Don't Know My Name" (instrumental version) — 4:27

 US 12-inch single
A1. "You Don't Know My Name" (radio mix) — 4:26
A2. "You Don't Know My Name" (instrumental) — 4:27
B1. "You Don't Know My Name" (album mix) — 6:08
B2. "You Don't Know My Name" (acappella) — 4:26

 Canadian and European CD single
 "You Don't Know My Name" — 5:28
 "Diary" (featuring Tony! Toni! Toné!) — 4:45

 UK CD single
 "You Don't Know My Name" — 4:20
 "Fallin'" (Ali soundtrack version) — 4:30

 European enhanced CD single
 "You Don't Know My Name" — 4:20
 "Fallin'" (Ali soundtrack version) — 4:30
 "Butterflyz" (Roger's Release Mix) — 3:54
 "You Don't Know My Name" (video)

 European CD maxi-single
 "You Don't Know My Name" — 5:28
 "Diary" (featuring Tony! Toni! Toné!) — 4:45
 "You Don't Know My Name" (instrumental version) — 4:27

 European 12-inch single
A1. "You Don't Know My Name" (radio edit) — 3:07
A2. "Fallin'" (Ali soundtrack version) — 6:08
B1. "You Don't Know My Name" (instrumental version) — 4:27

Personnel

 Alicia Keys –  producer, vocals, background vocals
 Sanford Allen – concertmaster, violin
 Tony Black – engineer
 Richard Brice – viola
 Kurt Briggs – violin
 Avril Brown – violin
 Robert Chausow – viola
 Ray Chew – string conductor, string arrangements
 Barry Finclair – viola
 Eileen Folson – cello
 Sharief Hobley – guitar
 Stanley Hunte – violin
 John Legend – background vocals

 Harold Lilly – background vocals
 Manny Marroquin – mixing
 Lori Miller – violin
 Ann Mincieli – engineer
 Caryl Paisner – cello
 Marion Pinheiro – violin
 Herb Powers Jr. – mastering
 Artie Reynolds – bass guitar
 Maxine Roach – viola
 Alexander Vselensky – violin
 Kanye West – producer
 Xin Zhao – violin

Charts

Weekly charts

Year-end charts

Decade-end charts

Certifications

Release history

See also
 Billboard Year-End Hot 100 singles of 2004
 List of number-one R&B singles of 2004 (U.S.)

References

External links
 You Don't Know My Name at Discogs

2003 singles
2004 singles
Alicia Keys songs
Music videos directed by Chris Robinson (director)
Song recordings produced by Kanye West
Songs written by Alicia Keys
Songs written by Harold Lilly (songwriter)
Songs written by Kanye West